The 1997–98 Chicago Blackhawks season was the 72nd season of operation of the Chicago Blackhawks in the National Hockey League. The Blackhawks did not qualify for the 1998 Stanley Cup Playoffs, which snapped their 28 year playoff streak.

Offseason

Regular season

The Blackhawks were shut out a league-high 11 times, tied with the Mighty Ducks of Anaheim and the Tampa Bay Lightning. With the 10 shutouts that Blackhawks goaltenders recorded, a total of 21 of Chicago's 82 regular-season games ended in a shutout. The Blackhawks also tied the Florida Panthers, New York Islanders and Pittsburgh Penguins for the most short-handed goals allowed, with 16. Also, the Blackhawks missed the playoffs for the first time since 1969.

Final standings

Schedule and results

Player statistics

Awards and records

Transactions

Draft picks
Chicago's draft picks at the 1997 NHL Entry Draft held at the Civic Arena in Pittsburgh, Pennsylvania.

See also
1997–98 NHL season

References
 

C
C
Chicago Blackhawks seasons
Chic
Chic